The 1995 African Women's Championship was the second staging of the CAF Women's Championship, the women's football championship of Africa (CAF). It determined the CAF's single qualifier for the FIFA Women's World Cup 1995: the winner was Nigeria.
Eight teams were scheduled to play in the tournament, but two of them withdrew, leaving six teams to compete for the right to represent Africa in the World Cup.

In the tournament, 55 goals were scored in 10 matches.

Participating teams
The eight participating teams were:

Bracket

First round
in 1994:

Nigeria win 11–0 on aggregate.

South Africa win 11–5 on aggregate.

Cameroon withdraw. Angola advance.

Guinea withdraw. Ghana advance.

Second round
in January 1995:

Nigeria win 5–0 on aggregate.

South Africa win 6–4 on aggregate.

Final round
in March 1995:

Nigeria won 11–2 on aggregate, won the tournament and qualified for 1995 FIFA Women's World Cup

Awards

Team statistics

|-
|colspan="10"|Eliminated in the second round
|-

|-
|colspan="10"|Eliminated in the first round
|-

External links
 Results at RSSSF.com

CAF
Women's Africa Cup of Nations tournaments
1995 FIFA Women's World Cup qualification
Women